Alberta Provincial Highway No. 29, commonly referred to as Highway 29, is a  highway in east–central Alberta, Canada that connects Highway 15 near Lamont to Highway 41 north of Elk Point.

The route was established in 2006 when Alberta Transportation renumbered portions of Highways 637, 45, 860, 36, and 28 between Highways 15 and 41, forming a more coherent route between St. Paul and Edmonton that involved only two numbered highways.

Route description
It descends to a low point of  AMSL as it crosses the North Saskatchewan River near Brosseasu, ending at  AMSL north of Elk Point. There are almost no curves until Duvernay when it changes from an east–west alignment to north–south. Beyond St. Paul, the road becomes slightly more curvaceous and terrain is marginally more wooded near the gradual transition point into the boreal forest of northern Alberta.

The highway begins as a spur from Highway 15, which itself begins in the Edmonton Capital Region and runs northeast into Lamont County where it turns east. Northwest of the town of Lamont, Highway 15 bends southeast and continues onward to Chipman and Mundare. Highway 29 begins at this bend, branching east from Highway 15 and running through the rural farmland of central Alberta toward Saskatchewan. The route first intersects Highway 831, which serves as an alternate route into Lamont from the north. Entering Two Hills County, the road meets Highway 45 near Hairy Hill. The two highways continue concurrently east for  until, after curving southeast, Highway 29 splits north while Highway 45 continues southeast to Two Hills.

Following the former alignment of Highway 860 for only 1.3 km, Highway 29 then turns east along Township Road 554 to meet Highway 36 near the hamlet of Duvernay.  It and Highway 36 continue concurrently north through Duvernay prior to a crossing of the North Saskatchewan River.  The bridge was first built in 1930 and later replaced in 1978.  The hamlet of Brosseau lies on the river's north bank, north of which the road passes Lac Brosseau before curving east past Foisy into St. Paul County.  The concurrent highways meet Highway 646, which continues east to Lafond and Elk Point.  Highways 29 and 36 veer due north, briefly crossing a section of the Saddle Lake Cree Nation before re-entering St. Paul County. Highway 652 branches west to Saddle Lake, and  later, the concurrency ends at St. Brides as Highway 29 turns east toward St. Paul from Highway 36 which continues north to Ashmont.

Highway 29 remains in an east–west direction for most of its remaining  in St. Paul County. It passes a series of small lakes and the St. Paul Airport before reaching the town of St. Paul. The speed limit reduces to  then  as the highway becomes 50 Avenue and widens to four lanes while bisecting the town. Traffic lights control an intersection with Highway 881 at the east end of town. After a brief concurrency, Highway 881 turns south to Myrnam at a second intersection further east, and Highway 29 continues east through St. Paul County. It curves slightly northeast before straightening out to the east and passing the hamlet of St. Edouard, turning southeast across Atimoswe Creek on a culvert.

History 
Highway 29 was not designated until October 2006, and involved no new construction. It is composed entirely of redesignated highways and concurrencies, with the intention of simplifying the journey from Edmonton to St. Paul which now involves only Highways 15 and 29. The first segment of Highway 29 between Highway 15 near Lamont and Highway 45 northwest of Hairy Hill was formerly Highway 637. A concurrency with Highway 45 precedes a short segment of Highway 860 which was re-signed as Highway 29. The highway turns back east on a segment that was formerly Highway 637.

Major intersections

Notes

References 

029